San Leucio del Sannio is a comune (municipality) in the Province of Benevento in the Italian region Campania, located about 50 km northeast of Naples and about 6 km south of Benevento. As of 31 December 2004, it had a population of 3,269 and an area of 10.0 km2.

San Leucio del Sannio borders the following municipalities: Apollosa, Benevento, Ceppaloni, Sant'Angelo a Cupolo.

Demographic evolution

References

Cities and towns in Campania